In early 2008 it was announced that Italy had replaced Serbia in the European Shield. Serbia were elevated to a higher level with Russia and Lebanon after easily winning the 2007 shield and doing well in the World Cup qualifying matches. Italy were one of the newest European nations to adopt rugby league with the Veneto 9s the only RL tournament in the country at the time.

Results

Standings

See also

References

External links

European Shield